William Beverley (1696–1756) was an 18th-century legislator, civil servant, planter and landowner in the Colony of Virginia. Born in Virginia, Beverley—the son of planter and historian Robert Beverley, Jr. (c. 1667–1722) and his wife, Ursula Byrd Beverley (1681–1698)—was the scion of two prominent Virginia families. He was the nephew of Peter Beverley (1668–1728), Speaker of the Virginia House of Burgesses, and the grandson of wealthy Virginia planter William Byrd I (1652–1704) of Westover Plantation. Beverley's mother died shortly before her 17th birthday (when he was a toddler), and he was sent to England.

After his education in England he began a career in public service as the Clerk of Court for Essex County (1716–1745) and in the Virginia House of Burgesses, representing Orange (1736–1738) and Essex Counties (1742–1749). Beverley also served on the Virginia Governor's Council in 1750.

He inherited a large estate after his father's death in 1722, amassing significant landholdings throughout Virginia from which he received revenue from tobacco production and rent from 119 tenants. His development of the  Beverley Manor tract in present-day Augusta County encouraged further settlement west of the Blue Ridge Mountains. Beverley was commissioned by Thomas Fairfax, 6th Lord Fairfax of Cameron, for an expedition with Peter Jefferson to establish the Fairfax Line of the Northern Neck Proprietary.

Early life and education 
Beverley was born in 1696, the only child of Robert Beverley, Jr. (c. 1667–1722) and his wife, Ursula Byrd Beverley (1681–1698). Robert Beverley, Jr., of the Beverley Park plantation in King and Queen County, was a wealthy planter who participated in the Knights of the Golden Horseshoe Expedition and was the first native-born historian of colonial Virginia; he wrote the History of the Present State of Virginia in 1705, the first known history of Virginia. William Beverley's uncle, Peter (1668–1728), was Speaker of the Virginia House of Burgesses. His mother, the daughter of William Byrd I (1652–1704) and Maria Horsmanden Byrd of Westover Plantation, was affectionately known as "Little Nutty" by her family. She died on October 31, 1698, shortly before her 17th birthday, and was buried in Jamestown. Through his paternal grandmother, Margaret Boyd Beverley, William Beverley was a great-grandson of Scottish noble James Boyd, 9th Lord Boyd (died 1654). After his mother's death Beverley was sent to England, where he was educated.

Political career 
After his education was completed, Beverley returned to Virginia and began a career in public service. He was the Clerk of Court for Essex County for 29 years (1716–1745), when the first Essex County courthouse was on Beverley's Blandfield estate. Beverley was also an Essex County judge from 1720 to 1740. He was a member of the Virginia House of Burgesses in Williamsburg, elected to represent Orange (1736–1738) and Essex Counties (1742–1749). During his first term as Orange County burgess, Beverley served with Robert Green. He represented Essex County with James Ganett until 1747, after which he served with William Daingerfield until 1749. Beverley's appointment as county lieutenant and commander-in-chief of the militias of Augusta and Orange Counties in 1741 was confirmed in the Orange County Court on November 3, 1741. In 1750 he was appointed to the Virginia Governor's Council, the upper house of Virginia's colonial legislature, replacing John Custis IV (father-in-law of Martha Dandridge Custis). Beverley's appointment to the Governor's Council fulfilled an ambition which his father was unable to achieve.

Agricultural pursuits and landholdings 

Beverley inherited a large estate after his father's death in 1722, and continued speculating in land. He received income from tobacco production and rent from tenant farmers. Although by 1745 Beverley's estate produced 57 hogsheads (about 26,000 kg) of tobacco, the income from his 119 tenants in Caroline, Culpeper, Orange and King and Queen Counties was far more lucrative.

After his marriage to Elizabeth Bland about 1725 Beverley lived at Blandfield, a  estate along the Rappahannock River in Saint Anne's Parish of Essex County which he named for his wife's family. Blandfield was granted by patent to his grandfather, Robert Beverley, Sr., in 1683 as part of a  tract. Construction of Beverley's first, Georgian-style mansion at Blandfield (which is no longer standing) probably began around 1750. Blandfield had wharves on the Rappahannock from which the plantation's tobacco was shipped across the Atlantic.

In addition to agriculture and land tenancy, Beverley received additional revenue from land sales in western Virginia. The easing of restrictive land laws by the Virginia colonial government allowed him to establish his own terms with settlers on his lands, and he initially sold parcels in the Shenandoah Valley. On September 6, 1736, Beverley, John and Richard Randolph and John Robinson were deeded a land patent by Sir William Gooch, 1st Baronet on behalf of the crown for a  tract at the headwaters of the South Fork Shenandoah River in present-day Augusta County. On September 16 the Randolphs and Robinson transferred sole ownership of the tract to Beverley, who planned to survey and sell it; the tract, which became known as Beverley Manor, encouraged further settlement west of the Blue Ridge Mountains. He commissioned James Patton, a ship captain from County Donegal, to recruit Irish and Scotch-Irish immigrants to purchase and settle his Augusta County land. On August 8, 1737, Beverley wrote to Patton, "I should be very glad if you could import families enough to take the whole off from our hands at a reasonable price and tho' the order mentions families from Pensilvania [sic], yet families from Ireland will do as well". In 1738 he authorized John Lewis of northern Ireland, the father of Thomas Lewis, to show and sell his land in Augusta County and donated a lot in Staunton for the construction of the Augusta County Courthouse ten years later.

He and others, including John Robinson and his father (also named John), purchased  on the Greenbrier River in 1745 for speculation and settlement. Beverley's land sales totaled  by 1744, and by his death in 1756 he had sold  and made a profit of £2,647.

According to historian Turk McCleskey, the land grants to Beverley from the Governor's Council on behalf of the crown "reflected the Council's recognition both of his elite connections and of his demonstrated leadership abilities".

Business pursuits 
Beverley owned and operated a tavern at Caroline Court House in Caroline County, and participated in trade with the West Indies. He wrote to a Barbadian merchant in 1739, "I am very conveniently situated for the sale of Negroes, rum, sugar & Mollasses [sic]". Beverley sold Barbadian salt in Virginia and shipped Virginia maize to Barbados. A partial inventory of his estate in 1745 listed 65 enslaved persons on four plantations, cattle, hogs, sheep and horses. In 1763 Beverley's son, Robert, reported that his father's estate earned "about £1800 Currency, all plantation expenses deducted".

Fairfax Line expedition 
In 1746 Beverley was commissioned by Thomas Fairfax, 6th Lord Fairfax of Cameron, to represent him in an expedition with Peter Jefferson (father of Thomas Jefferson) through western Virginia to mark the Fairfax Line of the Northern Neck Proprietary, supervising the work of Jefferson and the other surveyors. The following year, he and the other participants in the Fairfax Line expedition reconvened at Jefferson's Tuckahoe plantation to draft a map (which became known as the Fry-Jefferson Map) of the Northern Neck Proprietary.

Personal life and family 
Beverley married Elizabeth Bland (born May 26, 1706) around 1725. Elizabeth was the daughter of Richard Bland and Elizabeth Randolph Bland of Jordan's Point, and the sister of statesman Richard Bland. Beverley and his wife had four children: one son and three daughters—Robert Beverley (1740–1800), Elizabeth Beverley Mills, Ursula Beverley Fitzhugh and Anna Beverley. Beverley took an active role in his children's education, traveling to England in 1750 to enroll his son, his nephew Robert Munford III and another young man at Wakefield Grammar School.

Three of Beverley's children married into prominent Virginia families. Robert married Maria Carter, daughter of Landon Carter and Maria Byrd Carter of Sabine Hall, Richmond County. Elizabeth married James Mills, a merchant in Hobbs Hole, and Ursula married William Fitzhugh. Anna was unmarried at Beverley's death in 1756.

Beverley, an Anglican, had a close relationship with Anglican minister and parson Robert Rose of Saint Anne's Parish. Blandfield was in the parish, and his family attended Anglican (and later Episcopal) services at a church near the estate. On April 3, 1750 Beverley provided a lot in Staunton for the Anglican Augusta Parish Church, which was completed in 1763 and succeeded by the present Trinity Episcopal Church.

Death and legacy 
After Beverley's death in 1756, his son Robert was his designated heir at law. His wife Elizabeth inherited his plantations in Essex County, including the Blandfield estate and his "slaves, cattle, horses, hogs, and sheep" on the plantations. Beverley divided a large part of his fortune among his children and their spouses, bequeathing £500 to his daughter Elizabeth and leaving her husband, James Mills, "Money & slaves" valued at £1,000. Ursula also received £500 and her husband, William Fitzhugh, £1,000. Anna was unmarried at the time of Beverley's death; his will instructed Robert to maintain his sister until her marriage or her twenty-first birthday, when she would receive her inheritance. Robert inherited the remainder of the plantations and other lands, including the Beverley Manor tract in Augusta County and lots in the town of Staunton. Beverley Manor, an Augusta County magisterial district south of Staunton, is a namesake of the Beverley Manor patent. After his mother's death Robert also inherited Beverley's Essex County properties, including Blandfield (where he built the present Georgian mansion on the site of his father's residence between 1769 and 1773). Blandfield was owned by Beverley's descendants until its 1983 sale.

References

Bibliography

Further reading
 

1696 births
1756 deaths
18th-century American landowners
18th-century American politicians
American people of English descent
American people of Scottish descent
American planters
American real estate businesspeople
American slave owners
Beverley family of Virginia
Bland family of Virginia
British North American Anglicans
Businesspeople from Virginia
Byrd family of Virginia
County clerks in Virginia
House of Burgesses members
People from Essex County, Virginia
People from Orange County, Virginia
Real estate and property developers
Virginia Governor's Council members